Sidiga Abdelrahim Washi (Arabic; صديقةوشي  sidiga washiا) (5 May 1955 – 3 October 2018) was a Sudanese academic specializing in population, reproductive health and nutrition.

sidiga washi is a Professor of Family and Consumer Sciences/Community Nutrition and former Dean of the School of Family/Health Sciences and former Director Nutrition and Health Research and Training at Ahfad University for Women-Sudan. She is currently the Director of the Quality Assurance and Institutional Assessment Office at the University.

Education 
Bachelor of Science, Ahfad University

Bachelor of Science, Qatar University, 1984.

Master of Science, Iowa State University, 1988.

Doctor of Philosophy, Iowa State University, 1992.

Career 
Washi had the membership of Babiker Badri Science Association for Women Studies (as activist since 1985, and then as secretary 1985–1986), Washi also was follow of the American Vocational Education Association, International Vocational Education and Training Association, Women in Development (Honorary award 1991), International Federation of Home Economics, Home Economics Association for Africa, Sudanese Studies Association, Society Nutrition Education.

Positions held 

 International Federation of Home Economics (IFHE) President from 2016 to 2018
 Vice-president of East Africa Region for the International Vocational Education and Training Association (IVETA) for four years and a member of the Association of Women in Development (AWID).
 Consultant for OXFAM, UNICEF, UNFPA, and many other NGOs.

Recognition 
Washi was awarded the Glenn Murphy International Award by the Women's Club at her former university, Iowa State University, in recognition of her work towards the advancement of women in Sudan.

References 

1955 births
2018 deaths
Sudanese women academics
Qatar University alumni
Iowa State University alumni
Academic staff of United Arab Emirates University
Ahfad University for Women faculty